The pichi (Zaedyus pichiy), dwarf armadillo or pygmy armadillo is an armadillo native to Argentina. It is the only living member of the genus Zaedyus, and the only armadillo to hibernate.

Description

The carapace varies from light yellow to near-black, and consists of heavy scapular and pelvic shields composed of rectangular osteoderms, and separated by six to eight movable bands. An additional "nuchal" band lies in front of the scapular shield, and there is also a triangular shield on top of the head, and further osteoderms along the tail. The underside of the animal has a coat of tan-coloured hair, which is thicker and longer in winter; there are also a few long hairs protruding through small holes near the posterior edge of some of the scales. Pichis have well-developed claws on all four feet. The ears are short, and the eyes dark and relatively small.

Pichis have eight teeth on each side of the upper jaw, and nine on the lower. The absence of teeth on the premaxillary bone of the upper jaw is one of the features that allows them to be distinguished from other, similar, armadillos, such as the six-banded armadillo. The male's penis is unusually long among mammals, being about 60% of the total body length.

Distribution and habitat
Pichis are found from central and southern Argentina (Patagonia), west to the Andean grasslands of Chile, and south to the Strait of Magellan. Within this region, it most commonly inhabits arid or semiarid steppe grasslands, but may be found in other environments if they have sandy soils suitable for burrowing.

Subspecies 
Zaedyus pichiy caurinus Thomas, 1928
Zaedyus pichiy pichiy Desmarest, 1804

Biology
Pichis are omnivorous, with the largest part of their diet consisting of invertebrates such as beetles, ants, and scorpions, though they will also eat small mammals or lizards, as well as plant material and fungi. Despite living in arid environments, they are not thought to drink water in the wild. Common predators include crowned eagles, buzzard-eagles, foxes, and cougars.

Pichis are the only armadillos known to hibernate. Like many hibernating animals, they build up considerable fat reserves before entering their winter burrows, where they remain from May to August.

The breeding season lasts from spring to early summer, with the exact months depending on latitude. Females may be induced ovulators, and give birth to one or two young after a gestation period of 58 to 60 days, typically between October and January. The young are born with soft, pink skin with tiny osteoderms that begin to harden and turn more yellow after about two weeks.

Behaviour

Pichis are solitary and diurnal. They dig burrows in sandy soil, which they use for shelter from extremes of weather. The burrows have a dome-shaped entrance and a single passage that can reach several metres in length, before terminating in a bare, unlined, resting chamber. They do not inhabit their burrows for extended periods, digging new ones at least every few weeks, and sometimes daily.

Pichis are solitary outside of the mating season. When threatened, they wedge themselves into their shallow burrow making it difficult for an attacker to drag them out because of their jagged scales, or else lie flat on the ground to protect their vulnerable belly. They have been reported to make both purring sounds and a loud grunt or scream.

Conservation status
The IUCN has rated the conservation status of Z. pichiy as near-threatened. It is hunted for subsistence and sport, despite being protected in both Argentina. The armadillo is eaten and used in local handicrafts. Cattle ranching poses a threat to its habitat. Some populations have also been impacted by an unknown disease.

References

External links

Armadillos
Mammals of Patagonia
Mammals of Argentina
Mammals of Chile